The San Angelo Saints are a defunct professional ice hockey team that was based in San Angelo, Texas. Originally named the San Angelo Outlaws before being renamed "Saints" prior to the 2002–03 season, the team played three seasons in the Central Hockey League, from 2002 to 2005. The team was coached by Brent Scott in the franchise's first two seasons in the CHL when it missed making the playoffs, and was coached by Ray Edwards the following two seasons, losing in the first round of the playoffs each time.

During the franchise's four years in the CHL, they had an average attendance of less than 2,400 to their games.

Season-by-season record

Records
Note: this only includes CHL games
Games: Matt Frick 183
Goals: Trevor Weisgerber 56
Assists: Matt Frick 78
Points: Trevor Weidgerber 131
PIM: Kori Davison 380

References

External links
Team profile at Hockeydb.com

Defunct ice hockey teams in Texas
Ice hockey clubs established in 2002
Ice hockey clubs disestablished in 2005
Sports in San Angelo, Texas
2002 establishments in Texas
Ice hockey teams in Texas
2005 disestablishments in Texas